On My Mind is a 2021 Danish short film by Martin Strange-Hansen.

Summary
Inspired by the director's experience of losing his daughter, a man at a karaoke machine in a sleepy bar is trying to sing the country western pop standard "Always on My Mind" for his wife.

Cast
 Rasmus Hammerich as Henrik
 Camilla Bendix as Louise
 Ole Gorter Boisen as Preben
 Adam Brix as Doctor
 Anne-Marie Bjerre Koch as Nurse
 Sissel Bergfjord as Trine

Accolades
Best Live Action Short Film nomination - 94th Academy Awards

References

External links
On My Mind on IMDb

2021 films